Miedenmolen is a smock mill in Holwerd, Friesland, Netherlands which was built in 1855. The mill has been restored to working order. It is listed as a Rijksmonument, number 38696.

History

Meidenmolen was built in 1855 to drain the Dwergsmear Polder. In 1953, the water board decided to fully mechanise the mill. Meetings held on 27 December 1961 and 13 March 1962 resulted in the mill being assisted by an electric motor, but full mechanisation was not carried out. The mill was restored in 1966. The mill was sold to Stichting De Fryske Mole on 4 May 1976. Further restorations were carried out in 1978 and 1994, the latter was carried out by millwright Thijs Jellema of Birdaard. In 2004 a new steel Archimedes' screw was fitted. In 2006, the mill was officially listed as being held in reserve for use in an emergency.

Description

Meidenmolen is what the Dutch describe as an grondzeiler. It is a three-storey smock mill on a single-storey base. There is no stage, the sails reaching almost to the ground. The mill is winded by tailpole and winch. The smock and cap are thatched. The sails are Patent sails. The sails are carried on a cast-iron windshaft, which was cast in 1904 by De Munck Kiezer, Martenshoek, Groningen. The windshaft also carries the brake wheel which has 57 cogs. This drives the wallower (29 cogs) at  the top of the upright shaft. At the bottom of the upright shaft, the crown wheel, which has 44 cogs drives a gearwheel with 43 cogs on the axle of the Archimedes' screw. The axle of the Archimedes' screw is  diameter. It is inclined at 19.7°. Each revolution of the screw lifts  of water.

Public access
Meidenmolen is open by appointment.

References

Windmills in Friesland
Windmills completed in 1855
Smock mills in the Netherlands
Windpumps in the Netherlands
Rijksmonuments in Friesland
Octagonal buildings in the Netherlands